James Edward Anthony Tyler (31 October 1943 in Bristol – 28 October 2006 in Hastings, East Sussex) was a British writer who authored several books and wrote for the NME, Macworld, MacUser, PC Pro and Computer Shopper.

He joined  the NME in 1972, recruited by editor Alan Smith.

References

External links 
 tribute by Charles Shaar Murray
 RIP: UK Mac columnist Tony Tyler, Macworld
 Obituary, The Independent
 Obituary, The Guardian

1943 births
2006 deaths
English writers
English keyboardists
English male journalists
British public relations people
Deaths from cancer in England
NME writers
Journalists from Bristol
Royal Tank Regiment soldiers
Tolkien fandom
Military personnel from Bristol
20th-century British Army personnel